Van der Molen is a Dutch toponymic surname meaning "from the mill". People with this name include:

Gary Vandermolen (born 1960), English-Israeli footballer
Gezina van der Molen (1892–1978), Dutch legal scholar and resistance fighter 
Jan van der Molen (1924–2015), Dutch structural engineer working in Indonesia and Australia
Tim van de Molen, New Zealand politician

See also
 (1956- ), Argentinian folk singer with a Hispanicized version of the surname
Van der Meulen, surname with the same origin

References

Dutch-language surnames
Dutch toponymic surnames